The Canton of Grand-Couronne is a former canton situated in the Seine-Maritime département and in the Haute-Normandie region of northern France. It was disbanded following the French canton reorganisation which came into effect in March 2015. It had a total of 29,521 inhabitants (2012).

Geography 
An area of forestry and light industry situated on the left bank of the Seine,  immediately south of Rouen in the arrondissement of Rouen, centred on the town of Grand-Couronne. The altitude varies from 1m (Le Grand-Quevilly) to 139m (Grand-Couronne) with an average altitude of 18m.

The canton comprised 9 communes:

La Bouille
Grand-Couronne
Le Grand-Quevilly (partly)
Hautot-sur-Seine
Moulineaux
Petit-Couronne
Sahurs
Saint-Pierre-de-Manneville
Val-de-la-Haye

See also 
 Arrondissements of the Seine-Maritime department
 Cantons of the Seine-Maritime department
 Communes of the Seine-Maritime department

References

Grand-Couronne
2015 disestablishments in France
States and territories disestablished in 2015